FC Avanhard Lozova was an amateur Ukrainian football from Lozova.

History
The club appeared sometime after 1969.

Honours 
 Ukrainian Amateur Cup
 Winners (1): 1988
 Runners-up (1): 1989
 Kharkiv Oblast Championship
 Winners (4): 1982, 1983, 1988, 1992
 Kharkiv Oblast Cup
 Winners (6): 1983, 1986, 1987, 1988, 1990, 1991

References 

Football clubs in Kharkiv Oblast
Defunct football clubs in Ukraine
Lozova
Association football clubs established in 1969
Association football clubs disestablished in 2008
1969 establishments in Ukraine
2008 disestablishments in Ukraine